Brenda Cuming (born 2 September 1958) is a Canadian archer. She competed in the women's individual event at the 1988 Summer Olympics.

References

External links
 

1958 births
Living people
Canadian female archers
Olympic archers of Canada
Archers at the 1988 Summer Olympics
Place of birth missing (living people)